Renata Voráčová and Barbora Záhlavová-Strýcová were the defending champions, but they lost in the semifinals to Karolína Plíšková and Kristýna Plíšková.
Kristina Mladenovic and Katarzyna Piter won the title, defeating the Plíšková sisters in the final, 6–1, 5–7, [10–8].

Seeds

Draw

Draw

References
 Main Draw

Internazionali Femminili di Palermo - Doubles
2013 Doubles